Lazarenkoa is a genus of fungi in the class Dothideomycetes. The relationship of this taxon to other taxa within the class is unknown (incertae sedis). A monotypic genus, it contains the single species Lazarenkoa selaginellae.

See also
 List of Dothideomycetes genera incertae sedis

References

External links
 Index Fungorum

Monotypic Dothideomycetes genera
Dothideomycetes enigmatic taxa